Eesti Telefilm is an Estonian movie studio established in 1956. It is structural unit of Eesti Televisioon.

In 1965, the studio became independent from ETV.

The studio is produced documentary and live action films. At least 400 documentaries and 250 music films have been produced at the Eesti Telefilm studio.

Filmography (selection)
1969  Mehed ei nuta
1972 A Young Retiree
1979 Siin me oleme!
1998 Georgica

References 

Film production companies of Estonia
1956 establishments in Estonia
Mass media in Estonia
Mass media companies established in 1956